Shamet Luta (born 26 June 1995) is an Albanian professional footballer who has played as a forward for KF Elbasani in the Albanian First Division.

Career

Early career
Luta began his career with his local side KF Elbasani as a teenager where he played for the club's youth teams before making his first team debut in the Albanian First Division on 30 March 2013 in a 2–1 away win against Tërbuni Pukë, where he came on as a 68th-minute substitute for Eri Lamçja. He made two appearances during the second half of the 2012–13 campaign before being loaned out to Albanian Second Division side KF Gramshi ahead of the 2013–14 season. He returned to his parent club KF Elbasani for the second half of the season where he played 3 league games as his side won the First Division and were promoted to the Albanian Superliga. He played a more significant role during the 2014–15 season in Albania's top flight, as he made 14 league appearances for a side that finished bottom of the table and were relegated. He scored his first professional goal in the Albanian Cup on 5 November 2014 against KF Laçi, in what was the first goal scored by a KF Elbasani player at the newly renovated Elbasan Arena.

References

1995 births
Living people
Footballers from Elbasan
Albanian footballers
Association football forwards
KF Elbasani players
KF Gramshi players
KS Shkumbini Peqin players
Kategoria Superiore players
Kategoria e Parë players
Kategoria e Dytë players